"Mad Dogs and Englishmen" is a song written by Noël Coward and first performed in The Third Little Show at the Music Box Theatre, New York, on 1 June 1931, by Beatrice Lillie. The following year it was used in the revue Words and Music and also released in a "studio version". It then became a signature feature in Coward's cabaret act.

The song's title refers to its refrain, "Mad dogs and Englishmen go out in the midday sun." (The saying "Only mad dogs and Englishmen go out in the midday sun" is  believed to have been coined by Rudyard Kipling.) The song begins with the first 10 notes of "Rule Britannia". This song is considered a patter song, because the lyrics are mostly spoken rather than sung. One of the memorable lines in the first chorus is "But Englishmen detest a siesta".
 
According to Sheridan Morley, Coward wrote the song while driving from Hanoi to Saigon "without pen, paper, or piano".  Coward himself elucidated: "I wrestled in my mind with the complicated rhythms and rhymes of the song until finally it was complete, without even the aid of pencil and paper. I sang it triumphantly and unaccompanied to my travelling companion on the verandah of a small jungle guest house. Not only Jeffrey [Amherst], but the gecko lizards and the tree frogs gave every vocal indication of enthusiasm".

The Noonday Gun
The lines
In Hong Kong, they strike a gong, and fire off a noonday gun
To reprimand each inmate who's in late 
refer to the Noonday Gun opposite the Excelsior Hotel in Hong Kong, which is still fired every day at noon by a member of Jardines.  In 1968, Coward visited Hong Kong and fired the gun.

Churchill and Roosevelt
Coward wrote, "In Words and Music Romney Brent sang it as a missionary in one of Britain's tropical colonies. Since then I have sung it myself ad nauseam. On one occasion it achieved international significance. This was a dinner party given by Mr Winston Churchill on board HMS Prince of Wales in honour of President Franklin D. Roosevelt on the evening following the signing of the Atlantic Charter. From an eye-witness description of the scene it appears that the two world leaders became involved in a heated argument as to whether 'In Bangkok at twelve o'clock they foam at the mouth and run' came at the end of the first refrain or at the end of the second. President Roosevelt held firmly to the latter view and refused to budge even under the impact of Churchillian rhetoric. In this he was right and when, a little later, I asked Mr Churchill about the incident, he admitted defeat like a man."

Cultural references
 The song is parodied as part of a Lucky Strike commercial on The Jack Benny Show - 1956.
 The song is performed by Judy Garland, Lena Horne, Terry-Thomas and dancers on The Judy Garland Show: Episode 4, which aired October 13, 1963.
 The song is referenced in the 1964 novel, The Three Stigmata of Palmer Eldritch by Philip K. Dick.
 The song is referenced in episode 48 of My Favorite Martian, "Don't Rain on my Parade", which aired in 1964.
 It is the title of act one of the 1965 The Man from U.N.C.L.E. episode "The Bow-Wow Affair".
 In the tv show M.A.S.H. the song title is paraphrased and used as an episode title "Mad Dogs and Servicemen".
 The song is quoted and referenced in Mad Dogs & Englishmen, a 1970 live album by Joe Cocker and others (and in the 1971 film from the same tour as the album).
 The song is performed by Rowlf and two other Muppet dogs in the second season of The Muppet Show, as the "UK Spot," an extra sketch added to each episode's UK broadcast to fill what in the United States would be commercial time.
 The song title was used as a title of an episode of the Magnum P.I. tv show.
 The song is performed in Ten Little Indians (1989 film).
 The song is quoted in the 1995 Canadian/British film of the same name.
 A 2002 Doctor Who novel bears the same title.
 The song is referenced in the 2002 Justice League episode "The Brave and the Bold."
 Mad Gods and Englishmen is a 2006 comic strip by Simon Spurrier and Boo Cook, for the character Harry Kipling.
 A 2013 episode of Tom Kapinos' Californication is also named after the song.
 Mad Dogs & Englishmen is a National Review podcast by Charles C. W. Cooke and Kevin D. Williamson.
 A song by Andrea Lindsay and Luc De Larochellière from Québec is named "Mad Dogs & Englishmen."
 The song is referenced in series 2, episode 6 of White Gold (TV series), "Winning Isn't Everything", which aired in 2020.
 The song is referenced in season 39 of 'Nature (TV series)', "Big Bend" episode, narrated by Thomas Haden Church, which aired in 2021.

References

External links
Lyrics (www.traditionalmusic.co.uk)
"Mad Dogs and Englishmen" at Internet Archive (track #7, with the Ray Noble Orchestra, 1932)
, Noël Coward 
, Coward on CBS

1931 songs
Patter songs
Songs written by Noël Coward